The Portsmouth Grammar School is a co-educational private day school in Portsmouth, England, located in the historic part of Portsmouth. It was founded in 1732 as a boys' school and is located on Portsmouth High Street.

History

In 1732, William Smith, a former Mayor of Portsmouth and previously the garrison physician, died and left his estate to Christ Church, Oxford. His will contained instructions to build a new school in Portsmouth and thus, The Portsmouth Grammar School (PGS) was founded. The will of the founder is reflected to this day in that two Governors continue to be nominated by Christ Church. The school also retains its naval links, with the Second Sea Lord nominating one further Governor. In 1926 the school moved from its Victorian premises to Cambridge Barracks. The school was hit by bombs during the Second World War.

In 1976, with the removal of the Direct Grant, it stopped being a grammar school under the Tripartite System, though kept the term as part of its name, and at the same time began to accept female pupils. The Upper Junior School (Years 5–6) is situated in the original Victorian building which once contained the whole Grammar School. The Nursery, Lower Junior School (Reception to Year 4), Middle School and Upper School are located across the road on the High Street. The school colours are red, black and gold, and the school motto is Praemia Virtutis Honores (English: Honours are the rewards of virtue). The current Headmaster is Mr David Wickes, replacing Dr Anne Cotton. The school spent £6 million on a new Science building in 2011.

Academic performance
In 2004 the school came 67 out of 100 in a Guardian list of Top independent school's UCAS scores, There was an average AS/A level point score of 939.1 in 2009.

Internal structure
The Portsmouth Grammar School consists of three sections: Nursery (ages 2–4), Junior School (Reception to Year 6) and Senior School (Year 7 to Sixth Form). The Nursery, years 1-4, and Senior school are all situated on the same site. The Upper Junior School (years 5 & 6) is located just across Cambridge Junction on St George's Road.

Houses

In each section of PGS there are four houses, each represented by a colour and named after a former schoolmaster. Although these colours remain the same, the names change in each section of the School:

Houses form the basis of the school pastoral system and provide a continued 'home' throughout a pupil's time at the school. In the Upper School, each house has its own common room. Sixth Formers have their own common area and cafe, known as the Sixth Form Centre; they also have their own library.

Co-curricular activities
Pupils take part in trips each term to visit various countries. Pupils have visited France, Germany, Spain, Ireland, the United States, Syria, Russia, Norway, Hungary, Uganda and a number of other countries. Exchanges take place as a part of the Modern Foreign Languages programme each year, with pupils spending time in France, Spain or Germany and receiving a visit from their counterpart. Additionally, sports teams travel each year to various locations, which have included South Africa and Australia.

Aside from trips abroad, extracurricular activities include the Combined Cadet Force, a Debating Club, Wildlife Club, "Stock Market Club", "Model Rockets", and "Middle School Textiles Club".

The school was involved in the establishment of the education charity United World Schools and since 2010 has funded a Partner School in Cambodia through co-curricular activities.

Sport
Within the school grounds is a sports centre containing a multi-purpose hall, gymnasium, squash courts, weight lifting room and dance rooms. The school has sports grounds at Hilsea, which include various pitches as well as a pavilion. The school sometimes uses the HMS Temeraire grounds, and Governors Green in Portsmouth.

CCF
The school has a Combined Cadet Force open to pupils in Year 9 and above, which has Army, Royal Air Force and Royal Navy sections.

Music
In an article in the September 2006 BBC Music Magazine, the following was written about the music at PGS:

There are several ensembles that perform regularly, many conducted by the school's associate conductor, Nicolae Moldoveanu. The PGS Chamber Choir sang at the Festival of Remembrance at the Royal Albert Hall in 2005 and went on tour to Salzburg at Christmas 2006.  The Choir also sings regularly with the London Mozart Players and upholds an annual tradition of singing Evensong at Christ Church, Oxford.

Politics
The school has run mock elections for notable elections that have occurred at the time. In 2010, the History & Politics Department organised school elections for the 2010 UK election, where the school narrowly elected the Conservative Party, whilst in the 2012 US election the school voted in favour of the Democrats

Old Portmuthians

Alumni are known as Old Portmuthians and may join The Old Portmuthian Club, founded in 1885. Notable OPs include

William Henry Snyder Nickerson, VC (1875–1954), physician and soldier
Wally Hammond (1903–1965), England Cricketer and Captain
G. E. L. Owen (1922–1982), classicist and philosopher
James Clavell (1924–1994), novelist, director and, notably, the screenwriter of 1963 film, The Great Escape
Sir Peter Viggers (1938–), Conservative MP for Gosport (1974–2010) who was made famous for his expenses claim for a duck house
Fred Dinenage (1942–), presenter of ITV's local news programme, Meridian Tonight
Paul Jones (1942–), singer with Manfred Mann (1962–1966) and presenter of The Blues Show on BBC Radio 2 (1986–2018)
Ian Osterloh (1960–), Clinical researcher attributed with the creation of 'Viagra' as well as numerous cardiovascular drugs
Mel Stride (1961–), Conservative MP for Central Devon (2010–present) and former Leader of the House of Commons (2019)
Jock Clear (1963–), senior performance engineer working for Scuderia Ferrari in Formula One racing and former race engineer for Lewis Hamilton (2013–14). He is now the driver coach for Charles Leclerc.
Ed Richards (1965–), Chief Executive of Ofcom and former special adviser to Prime Ministers Tony Blair and Gordon Brown
Roger Black (1966–), Olympic athlete (silver medalist)
Murray Gold (1969–), TV, film and stage composer, whose work notably includes Doctor Who, since 2005
James Bobin (1972–), film director, writer and producer; directed the high-grossing 2011 film, The Muppets and its 2014 sequel
Rick Edwards (1979-), presenter, journalist and author; presents BBC quiz show Impossible
Ant Middleton (1981–), Former Royal Marine, writer, television personality and former host of TV series SAS: Who Dares Wins
Isaac Waddington (1999–), singer, pianist and finalist on the ninth series of Britain's Got Talent

See also
 List of English and Welsh endowed schools (19th century)

References

External links
 The Portsmouth Grammar School website
 Guide to Independent Schools entry
 The Old Portmuthian Club website
 

Educational institutions established in 1732
Private schools in Portsmouth
Secondary schools in Portsmouth
1732 establishments in England
Member schools of the Headmasters' and Headmistresses' Conference
International Baccalaureate schools in England